Dominique Béchard (born 21 October 1963) is a Mauritian athlete. He competed in the men's discus throw and the men's hammer throw at the 1984 Summer Olympics.

References

External links
 

1963 births
Living people
Athletes (track and field) at the 1984 Summer Olympics
Mauritian male discus throwers
Mauritian male hammer throwers
Olympic athletes of Mauritius
Place of birth missing (living people)